A privy examination, or "separate examination", was a United States legal practice in which a married woman who wished to sell her property had to be separately examined by a judge or justice of the peace outside of the presence of her husband and asked if her husband was pressuring her into signing the document.  This practice, which emerged from English common law, was seen as a means to protect married women's property from overbearing husbands.  A number of U.S. states continued to require privy examinations into the late 20th century.

References

Further reading 
 Stacy Braukman and Michael Ross, "Married Women's Property and Male Coercion: United States Courts and the Role of the Privy Examination, 1860-1883," Journal of Women's History, 12 (Summer 2000): 57-80. For an online version of this article see: 
 For information on the role of the privy exam in the 18th century see: Mary Lynn Salmon, Women and the Law of Property in Early America (Chapel Hill: UNC Press, 1989) 

History of women's rights in the United States
Property law in the United States